The 1999–00 Cincinnati Bearcats men's basketball team represented University of Cincinnati as a member of Conference USA during the 1999–2000 NCAA Division I men's basketball season. The head coach was Bob Huggins, serving in his 11th year at the school. The team held the #1 ranking in the AP poll for 12 weeks during the season, but had their national championship hopes undermined when Naismith Player of the Year Kenyon Martin broke his leg during the Conference USA tournament. The Bearcats finished with a 29–4 record (16–0 C-USA).

Roster
Source

Schedule and results

|-
!colspan=12 style=|Regular Season 

|-
!colspan=12 style=|Conference USA Tournament 

|-
!colspan=12 style=|NCAA Tournament

Rankings

^Coaches did not release a Week 1 poll.
*AP did not release post-NCAA Tournament rankings

Awards and honors
 Kenyon Martin, Adolph Rupp Trophy
 Kenyon Martin, Naismith College Player of the Year
 Kenyon Martin, USBWA College Player of the Year
 Kenyon Martin, John R. Wooden Award
 Kenyon Martin, Associated Press College Basketball Player of the Year
 Kenyon Martin, State Farm Division I Player of the Year Award
 Bob Huggins, C-USA Coach of the Year

NBA draft selections

References

External links 
1999-00 Cincinnati Bearcats Roster and Stats at Sports-Reference.com
1999-00 Cincinnati Bearcats on ESPN.com

Cincinnati Bearcats men's basketball seasons
Cincinnati
Cincinnati
Cincin
Cincin